Michela Murgia (born 3 June 1972) is an Italian novelist, playwright and radio personality. She is a winner of the Premio Campiello and the Mondello International Literary Prize.

Biography
Michela Murgia was born in Cabras, Sardinia on 3 June 1972. At the age of 18, she was taken in by her adoptive family as a filla de anima, a soul-child, a traditional Sardinian adoption. In contrast to the usual age of between 10 and 14 years, Murgia's adoption was delayed because of her natural father's opposition.

Murgia attended the Lorenzo Mossa Oristano institute for technical studies, and then joined the Institute of Religious Studies of the Roman Catholic Archdiocese of Oristano to study theology.

Murgia taught religious studies at middle and grammar schools in Oristano for six years but never finished her studies.

Career

Literary
Michela Murgia's first work, Il mondo deve sapere, was published in 2006. This was a satire on the telemarketing call centre, highlighting the economic exploitation and psychological manipulation of its workers. The book was dramatised for the stage by David Emmer and starred Teresa Saponangelo. It was also filmed by Paolo Virzì, and released in 2008 as Tutta la vita davanti.

In 2008, Murgia wrote a travel book on her native Sardinia, Viaggio in Sardegna.

Murgia's 2009 novel, Accabadora, gained several awards including the Mondello International Literary Prize and the Molinello Award for First Fiction.

L'incontro, a novella, appeared in 2012.

In 2013, Murgia co-authored a book titled L'ho uccisa perché l'amavo’. Falso! with Loredana Lipperini, which tackled the issues of violence on women in Italy.

In 2016, Murgia published "Chirú," a novel about a cross generational mentoring relationship.

Columnist
She writes for L'Espresso; her column, which began in January 2021, is titled "L'Antitaliana" ("the anti-Italian").

Actress
She performed in Quasi Grazia, a Play by Marcello Fois, as Grazia Deledda.

Political
In the regional elections of February 2014, she stood as a candidate as part of the Possible Sardinia coalition, which aimed to achieve Sardinian independence via the ballot, similar to the Catalan and the Scottish referendums of 2014. Murgia did not get a seat; she came third in the polls, gaining 10% of the vote.

Awards and honours
Murgia is a member of the Società Italiana delle Letterate.

 2010 - Premio Campiello
 2010 - Premio Mondello
 2009 - Premio Dessì

Bibliography

Novels

 Il mondo deve sapere: Romanzo tragicomico di una telefonista precaria (Milan: Edizioni, 2006) 
 Accabadora (Turin: Einaudi, 2009)  

 L'Incontro (Turin: Einaudi, 2012)

Non-fiction

 Viaggio in Sardegna: Undici percorsi nell'isola che non si vede (Turin: Einaudi, 2008)  
 ‘L'ho uccisa perché l'amavo’ : Falso! (with Loredana Lipperini) (Bari: Laterza, 2013)  
 ‘#Stai zitta e altre nove frasi che non vogliamo sentire più (Einaudi, 2021)

Works in English 
 Accabadora (Translated by Sylvester Mazzarella, Berkeley, CA: Counterpoint, 2012) 
 How to be a fascist : a manual, New York : Penguin Books, 2020.

References

1972 births
Living people
People from the Province of Oristano
21st-century Italian novelists
Italian non-fiction writers
Sardinian nationalists
Italian women novelists
21st-century Italian women writers
Premio Campiello winners
Sardinian women
21st-century Italian women politicians
Sardinian independence activists